Thomas Purfrey (c. 1556 – c. 1591), of Wells and Banwell, Somerset, was an English politician.

Family
Purfrey was the son of William Purfrey, probably of Hollingbourne, Kent or Shalston, Buckinghamshire. He married Blandina Godwyn, whose mother was Isabel Purfrey. Blandina's father was Thomas Godwyn, bishop of Bath and Wells, and her brother was the Wells MP, Thomas Godwyn. There are no reports of who his heir(s) were.

Career
He was a Member (MP) of the Parliament of England for Wells in 1589.

References

1550s births
1591 deaths
English MPs 1589
People from Wells, Somerset
People from Banwell